This is the discography of Dutch band Dolly Dots.

Albums

Studio albums

Live albums

Compilation albums

Box sets

Video albums

Singles

Notes

References

Discographies of Dutch artists
Pop music group discographies